Harold William Snell (born c. 1905) was a rugby union player who represented Australia.

Snell, a scrum-half, was born in Newcastle, New South Wales and claimed a total of 3 international rugby caps for Australia.

References

Australian rugby union players
Australia international rugby union players
Rugby union players from Newcastle, New South Wales
Rugby union scrum-halves